Album of Love is a 1982 studio album by The Three Degrees.

Overview
By the early 1980s The Three Degrees had established themselves as a live attraction and favourite television guests in the UK.  After their previous record label Ariola folded in 1980, they found themselves without a contract but that did not discourage the trio, consisting of Helen Scott, Sheila Ferguson and Valerie Holiday.  Ferguson co-wrote "A Sonnet To Love" and performed lead vocals  on that track.  Scott was given a rare opportunity to take a full lead on "I Only Have Eyes for You".  All three shared lead vocals on "MacArthur Park"  This track, together with the "Fame Medley" had recently been performed by the group on their second television special for the BBC, "Take 3 Degrees", which had been screened a year earlier.

Track listing
Side One
 "A Sonnet to Love"
 "I Only Have Eyes for You"
 "MacArthur Park"

Side Two
 Fame Medley
 "Fame Intro"
 "Dirty Old Man"
 "My Simple Heart"
 "Year of Decision"
 "Take Good Care of Yourself"
 "When Will I See You Again"
 "Fame Reprise"
 "Only Those in Love"
 "Dear God"
 "Hard to Say I'm Sorry"

Personnel

 Sheila Ferguson – vocals
 Valerie Holiday – vocals
 Helen Scott – vocals
 Erwin Keiles – producer
 Jerry Williamson – engineer
 Grant MacAvoy – drums
 Vince Fay – bass guitar
 Richard Rome – piano
 Erwin Keiles – all guitars
 Pete Wingfield – synthesizers and special keyboards
 John Kongos – programming

References 

1982 albums
The Three Degrees albums
Self-released albums